Rabbit show jumping, also known as rabbit agility or rabbit hopping, is an animal sport where the animals are led through a course by their owners, modelled after horse show jumping. It is typically conducted in a closed, indoor arena, with obstacles scaled to suit the rabbits.  Competitions have been held in the United States and several European countries. As rabbits are common domestic pets, some owners train their pet rabbits for this sport.

History 
Rabbit jumping started in Sweden in the 1970s, when the first rabbit club started to arrange rabbit jumping competitions.

At that time, the rules were based on the rules from horse jumping, but were later reformed to be better-suited for rabbits. The sport grew throughout Sweden and several rabbit jumping clubs were formed to support the growing interest. In the early 1990s, Norway joined in with rabbit jumping activities, developing new clubs and joining Sweden in rabbit jumping competitions. The  (Swedish Federation of Rabbit Jumping) was established on September 3, 1994. Rabbit show jumping became popular in all parts of Sweden.

The sport reached the United States in the 80s. The Rabbit Hopping Organization of America was founded in 2001. The rules and guidelines for rabbit hopping were for the club with the help of the judges' committee in Denmark and with personal assistance from judge Aase Bjerner.

The American Hopping Association for Rabbits and Cavies (AHARC) was chartered with the American Rabbit Breeders Association in 2013. The rules and guidelines for this association were moulded after RHOA and Denmark. The AHARC held the very first official national competition in the United States during the 2011 ARBA Convention in Indianapolis, IN. The performance competition for rabbits during 2013 ARBA convention in Harrisburg, Pennsylvania was a Mid Atlantic Rabbit and Cavy event. AHARC had the first national performance event for cavies during the 2014 ARBA TX convention. A rabbit hopping competition was held in 2017's North Carolina State Fair.
The Rabbit Hopping Society of Australia was founded in 2013, also with the assistance of Aase and Rasmus Bjerner.

In 2015 Freya Pocock Johansson founded Rabbit Hopping New Zealand.

Record jumps 

Earlier records 
High Jumps:
Snöflingans Majesty of Night (2015) (Sweden) 
Snöflingans Majesty of Night (2012) (Sweden) 
Tøsen (1997) (Denmark) 

Long Jumps:
Yaboo (1999) (Denmark)

Courses 

Official rabbit hopping competitions consist of a straight course, a crooked course, high jump, and long jump.
In a straight course all the obstacles are placed in a straight line and have to be jumped in succession. In a crooked course, the obstacles are placed in an interloping path in which the obstacles must be jumped in the correct order.

Straight and crooked courses are divided into 5 levels. The measurements are slightly different in different countries.
Mini:  Max 26 cm high, 30cm long (6-8 obstacles)
Easy:  Max 30 cm high, 45cm long (8 obstacles)
Medium: Max 38 cm high, 65cm long (10 obstacles)
Advanced: Max 45 cm high, 75cm long (10 obstacles)
Elite: Max 50 cm high, 80cm long (12 obstacles)

The mini-course is an introductory course. In order to progress from easy to medium, etc. a rabbit has to earn promotion points. Rabbits are placed according to the number of faults they have (such as knocking a rail down). Time only comes into play if 2 placing rabbits have tied for the same placing.

A rabbit has a set time (usually 60 minutes) to complete the course; if the time runs out before the course is completed, the rabbit is disqualified.

Breeds 

All breeds are allowed to compete; however, there may be problems with smaller and larger breeds.

The ideal jumping rabbit has long legs and a medium-long back, which will help it correctly judge the height and length of obstacles. In the case of slender bone structures, such as the Belgian Hare, the legs should be strong and muscular so high jumps will not hurt them. In Scandinavia, where rabbit show jumping has a strong base, most are crossbreeds, bred with good jumpers as parents, similar to the method of breeding lurchers, deliberately crossbred racing dogs. Scandinavian Jumping Rabbits can be regarded as their own breed, with well-kept pedigrees.

See also 

 Rat agility
 Dog agility
 Cat agility
 Behavioral enrichment

References

External links

Rabbit Hopping in Sweden
Canadian Rabbit Hopping Club
American Hopping Association for Rabbits and Cavies
Rabbit Hopping UK
Rabbit Hopping in Denmark
Rabbit Hopping in Norway
Rabbit Hopping in Australia
Vancouver Rabbit Agility Club
Rabbit Hopping New Zealand

Animals in sport
show jumping